The twenty-second series of the British medical drama television series Casualty commenced airing in the United Kingdom on BBC One on 8 September 2007 and finished on 9 August 2008.

Series overview

Like any accident and emergency department, Holby City Hospital A&E is a hectic, chaotic whirl of hospital staff, patients and visitors. But scratch the surface and there are gripping stories on all sides. Casualty interweaves these intriguing, exciting and dramatic tales with the loves and lives of the hospital staff in a compelling hospital drama series that has continued for over 20 years.

Following the tragic death of Selena Donovan at the end of Series 21, the staff of Holby City's Emergency Department find themselves thrown back into the thick of the action. With Corporate Mangager Nathan Spencer (Ben Price) struggling to cope with looking after Angel and new Executive Director Marilyn Fox (Caroline Langrishe) determined to ring in the changes it looks as if the first casualty will be Nathan himself.

Series 22 saw the arrival of many new characters to the team which included F2s Ruth Winters (Georgia Taylor) and Toby De Silva (Matthew Needham), Consultants Adam Trueman (Tristan Gemmill) and Zoe Hanna (Sunetra Sarker), Porter Big Mac (Charles Dale), Receptionist Noel Garcia (Tony Marshall), Paramedics Snezana Lalovic (Ivana Basic) and Curtis Cooper (Abdul Salis), Orthopaedic Consultant Sean Anderson (Richard Dillane) and his wife, Staff Nurse Jessica Harrison (Gillian Kearney) and Clinical Nurse Manager Simon Tanner (Paul Fox).

Dramatic changes in Series 22 included the departures of many beloved characters such as the long serving Josh Griffiths (Ian Bleasdale) and Harry Harper (Simon MacCorkindale) and as the series drew to a close it seemed yet another loved character was due to leave as Dr. Maggie Coldwell (Susan Cookson) quit Holby following a vicious court case.

Cast

Main characters 

Daphne Alexander as Nadia Talianos (until episode 19)
Matt Bardock as Jeff Collier (from episode 3)
Ivana Basic as Snezana Lalovic (from episode 26)
Ian Bleasdale as Josh Griffiths (until episode 10)
Susan Cookson as Maggie Coldwell (until episode 48)
Charles Dale as Big Mac (from episode 13)
Peter England as T.C. Cockleton (episodes 4−14)
Elyes Gabel as Guppy Sandhu (until episode 5)
Kip Gamblin as Greg Fallon (until episode 23)
Tristan Gemmill as Adam Trueman (from episode 3)
Sam Grey as Alice Chantrey
Jane Hazlegrove as Kathleen "Dixie" Dixon
Gillian Kearney as Jessica Harrison (from episode 21)
Joanne King as Cyd Pyke (until episode 3)
Simon MacCorkindale as Harry Harper (until episode 28)
Tony Marshall as Noel Garcia (from episode 20)
Janine Mellor as Kelsey Phillips
Matthew Needham as Toby De Silva (from episode 1)
Suzanne Packer as Tess Bateman
Ben Price as Nathan Spencer (until episode 6)
James Redmond as John "Abs" Denham
Abdul Salis as Curtis Cooper (from episode 27)
Sunetra Sarker as Zoe Hanna (from episode 18)
Georgia Taylor as Ruth Winters (from episode 1)
Derek Thompson as Charlie Fairhead (until episode 17, from episode 28)

Recurring characters 

Robyn Addison as Joanne Coldwell (episodes 22−43)
Richard Dillane as Sean Anderson (episodes 27−48)
Danny Emes as Lucas Anderson (from episode 34)
Miffy Englefield as Amelia Anderson (from episode 34)
Gregory Foreman as Louis Fairhead (from episode 13)
Caroline Langrishe as Marilyn Fox (from episode 4)
Andrew Newton-Lee as Stacey Merrick (from episode 30)
Sarah-Jane Potts as Ellie Merrick (from episode 30)

Guest characters 

Sudha Bhuchar as Devika (episodes 4−10)
Sharon Duce as Sheila Denham (episode 30)
Paul Fox as Simon Tanner (episodes 39−48)
Stella Gonet as Jayne Grayson (episodes 28−29)
Cherie Lunghi as Camille Windsor (episodes 14 and 47−48)
Amanda Mealing as Connie Beauchamp (episode 2)
Jack Smethurst as Stan Powell (episode 4)
Julia St. John as Sarah Evans (episodes 9, 21 and 25)

Episodes

Notes

References

External links
 Casualty series 22 at the Internet Movie Database

22
2007 British television seasons
2008 British television seasons